WKYL (102.1 FM) is a radio station  broadcasting a unique classic hits format consisting of rock and pop music from the 1960s, 1970s, and 1980s. Licensed to Lawrenceburg, Kentucky, the station primarily serves areas of the Bluegrass region of Central Kentucky, including the Lexington metropolitan area.  WKYL is currently owned by CapCity Communications and licensed under Southern Belle, LLC.

History
From its sign-on in 1993 until July 1, 2011, the station programmed a popular Smooth Jazz format fed via satellite from the Broadcast Architecture Smooth Jazz Network. In 2011, Davenport Broadcasting, the station's previous owner, entered into a local marketing agreement with Eastern Kentucky University to allow WEKU to program a Classical music format on WKYL to complement the Public Radio format broadcast on WEKU.
 
On December 16, 2019, WKYL ended its relationship with Eastern Kentucky University after the latter announced just days earlier that it would be moving its classical music programming to online-only distribution; EKU explained that it was no longer financially able to program a second terrestrial broadcast station. Consequently, Davenport entered into a new time brokerage agreement with Frankfort-based CapCity Communications, resulting in a format change to Classic Hits for WKYL as a simulcast of WFRT. The two stations operate under the branding "Passport Radio 103-7 & 102-1". Davenport Broadcasting closed on its sale of the station to CapCity Communications in early 2020.

Popular culture
WKYL-TV was the call sign of the fictional TV station featured in MGM's last movie released in 1959, "The Gazebo".

WKYL is the call sign displayed above the entrance to a New York City radio station in the 1959 HarBel Productions, Metro-Goldwyn-Mayer release The World, The Flesh and The Devil. The movie, filmed in black and white, stars Harry Belafonte, Inger Stevens and Mel Ferrer and deals with the relationship between three survivors in a world destroyed by nuclear holocaust.

WKYL is also the call sign of the fictional TV station of Terminal City featured in "Dial 1119", another MGM movie released in 1950.

References

External links

KYL
Classic hits radio stations in the United States
Anderson County, Kentucky